Events from the year 1892 in China.

Incumbents
 Guangxu Emperor (18th year)
 Regent: Empress Dowager Cixi

Events 
China Complaint On U.S. Immigration Bill

Births 

 Chen Guofu (1892-1951), Tongmenghui member and ROC politician

References 

 

 

 
Years of the 19th century in China